Amy-Cathérine de Bary (born 29 January 1944) is a Swiss equestrian and Olympic medalist. She competed in dressage at the 1984 Summer Olympics in Los Angeles, where she won a silver medal with the Swiss team.

References

External links

1944 births
Living people
Swiss female equestrians
Swiss dressage riders
Olympic equestrians of Switzerland
Olympic silver medalists for Switzerland
Equestrians at the 1984 Summer Olympics
Olympic medalists in equestrian
Medalists at the 1984 Summer Olympics